Miss World 2021 was the 70th edition of the Miss World pageant, held at the Coca-Cola Music Hall in San Juan, Puerto Rico on 16 March 2022. The coronation was originally scheduled to be held on 16 December 2021 at the José Miguel Agrelot Coliseum. However, the pageant was rescheduled to 16 March 2022 due to the COVID-19 outbreak in Puerto Rico.

At the end of the event, Toni-Ann Singh of Jamaica crowned Karolina Bielawska of Poland as Miss World 2021. It is the second victory of Poland in the history of the pageant after their victory in 1989.

Contestants from 97 countries and territories competed in this year's pageant, featuring the smallest number of candidates at the pageant since 2003. The pageant was hosted by Peter Andre for the second time, and Fernando Allende. Don Omar, Gente de Zona, Victor Manuel, Pedro Capó, and the Puerto Rico Philharmonic Orchestra (Filarmónica de Puerto Rico) conducted by Angel Velez with guest conductor Mike Dixon performed in this year's pageant.

Background

Location and date

The edition was initially set at the end of 2020 but was postponed indefinitely due to the global COVID-19 pandemic. On 8 March 2021, the Miss World Organization confirmed that the competition will take place at the Coca-Cola Music Hall in San Juan, Puerto Rico on 16 December 2021.

The threat of the Omicron variant had already detected in some parts of the world during the pre-pageant activities, as the disease started to ravage and swept across the island. On 14 December Miss World Indonesia Pricilia Carla Yules tested positive for COVID-19. As a precaution, her roommate Miss World India Manasa Varanasi and five others were classified as suspected cases. Miss World Organization chairwoman Julia Morley confirmed that the delegates are currently isolated and in quarantine and that they will not be on stage for the final show if they do not produce a negative PCR test. On 15 December, Puerto Rico Department of Health confirmed that 17 positive cases for COVID-19 related to the Miss World pageant activities, includes contestants and technical personnel.

An official statement stating that Miss World Malaysia Lavanya Sivaji tested positive for COVID-19 by her national director via Miss World Malaysia Instagram on 16 December 2021. She was required to be isolated for 10 days and will not be permitted on the stage during the finals as part of Puerto Rico Department of Health and Miss World guidelines. The finale, originally slated 16 December, was later postponed and will be held on an unspecified date but within 90 days in Puerto Rico. On 16 December, epidemiologist Melissa Marzán confirmed that 15 staff and 23 contestants were positive cases associated with Miss World during the Puerto Rico Department of Health press conference. She added that pageant organizers decided to postpone, not the island's authorities.

On December 22, the Miss World Organization announced via the Miss World social media accounts that the rescheduled 70th Miss World pageant would take place on 16 March 2022 and would be held at Puerto Rico's Coca-Cola Music Hall instead of the José Miguel Agrelot Coliseum. Only the 40 semifinalists had returned to Puerto Rico from 9 to 11 March 2022 for the rescheduled event.

Selection of participants 
Contestants from 97 countries and territories were selected to compete in the competition. Due to the pandemic, numerous national pageants were postponed or canceled entirely, resulting in multiple former runners-up from previous national pageants being appointed, or casting processes taking place instead. Eight of these delegates were designees after the original contestant withdrew or elapsed her reign.

Andrea Montero, Miss World Costa Rica 2020, was expected to represent the Costa Rica at Miss World. However, due to the COVID-19 pandemic, Montero elapsed her reign as Miss World Costa Rica, making her no longer eligible to compete. Due to this, Tamara Dal Maso was appointed as Miss World Costa Rica 2021. The same happened with Miss World America 2020 Alissa Anderegg, where she was replaced by Miss World America 2021 Shree Saini, a semi-finalist at Miss World America 2020, Miss World Japan 2020 Maria Kaneya, where she was replaced by Miss World Japan 2021 Tamaki Koshi, Miss Rwanda 2020 Nishimwe Naomie, where she was replaced by  Miss Rwanda 2021 Grace Ingabire, and Miss Senegal 2020 Ndeye Fatima Dione where she was replaced by Miss Senegal 2021 Penda Sy.

Amela Agastra was appointed as the representative of Albania after Joanna Kiose, Miss World Albania 2021, withdrew due to undisclosed reasons. Lizzy Dobbe, the first runner-up of Miss World Netherlands 2020-2021, was appointed to represent the Netherlands since Dilay Willemstein, Miss World Netherlands 2020-2021, doesn't want to take the vaccine against COVID-19. Juliana Rugumisa was appointed as the representative of Tanzania after Miss Tanzania 2020/2021 Rose David Manfere breached her contract with Miss Tanzania. 

On 15 December, the government of Sint Maarten officially denounced the participation of Lara Mateo at Miss World 2021 as dutch territory representative. The current franchise holder of the Miss and Mr World license for Sint Maarten did not select Lara Mateo for her participation; they are currently under investigation by the government. Prime Minister Silveria Jacobs said the government discovered that Lara Mateo was wrong registered by Guadeloupe's franchise holder to represent Sint Maarten. The local government issued an official letter stating that they did not endorse Lara Mateo to Miss World. She added that Collectivité de Saint-Martin, neither their Tourism Department nor the Culture Department, did not know or acknowledge the candidate and reassured that their winners would solely compete at Miss France.

The 2021 edition saw the debuts of Iraq and Bahrain, and the returns of Belize, Cameroon, Cote D'Ivoire, Estonia, Guinea, Madagascar, Namibia, Norway, Saint Lucia, Serbia, Sint Maarten, and Uruguay. Sint Maarten last competed in 2001, Estonia last competed in 2007, Namibia last competed in 2015, Saint Lucia last competed in 2016, Cote D'Iviore, Guinea and Uruguay last competed in 2017, while the others last competed in 2018. Antigua and Barbuda, Aruba, Australia, Bangladesh, Barbados, Belarus, British Virgin Islands, Croatia, Cook Islands, Denmark, Ethiopia, Georgia, Greece, Guatemala, Guyana, Hong Kong, Kazakhstan, Kyrgyzstan, Laos, Montenegro, Myanmar, New Zealand, Russia, Samoa, Sierra Leone, South Sudan, Thailand, and the US Virgin Islands withdrew. Both Darya Goncharevich of Belarus and  Natalija Labovic of Montenegro withdrew due to health concerns. Star Hellas 2021 Anna Pavlidou of Greece withdrew after not getting the second dose for the COVID-19 vaccine. Michelle Calderon of Guatemala, Nazerke Karmanova of Kazakhstan, and Adesha Penn of the US Virgin Islands withdrew due to undisclosed reasons.

Incidents before the pageant
On 28 February 2022, Del Valle took to Instagram to announce she would no longer be hosting the pageant's 70th edition, claiming "It is contrary to my ethics and moral principles to continue working with an organization that has acted in a defamatory, frivolous and unfair manner; solely for the purpose of causing harm." Puerto Rico with a Purpose's lawsuit against Del Valle and Del Valle's countersuit are still active.

Results 
15 contestants earned their spot in the semi-finals via various challenges and the remaining 25 semi-finalists were officially announced via Miss World Facebook page on 21 January 2022. There was a tie for the Top 12 placements on the coronation night, which increased the placements to Top 13 which include the Digital Media Challenge Winner. Shree Saini of United States was awarded as Beauty With A Purpose Ambassador and she will accompany the new Miss World, Karolina Bielawska of Poland during her reign.

Final results 

§ Digital Media Challenge Winner

Continental Queens of Beauty

Challenge Events

Head-to-Head Challenge

The contestants were officially assigned to their grouping via Miss World YouTube Channel on 24 November 2021. The winner of each group will compete at the head-to-head final in the Capitol of Puerto Rico on 9 December. The eight semi-finalists who won at the second round will automatically be part of the Top 40.

Round 1
  Advanced to Round 2 of the Head-to-Head Challenge.
  Advanced to Round 2 of the Head-to-Head Challenge, but advanced to the Top 40 via judges' choice or a challenge event other than Head-to-Head Challenge.
  Advanced to the Top 40 via a challenge event other than Head-to-Head Challenge.
  Advanced to the Top 40 via judges' choice.

Note:  wasn't assigned to any group for the Head-to-Head challenge.

Round 2
  Advanced to the Top 40 via the Head-to-Head challenge.

Talent
Talent finals was held on 4 December 2021 The winner were officially announced via Miss World Facebook page on 13 December 2021.

Top Model
Top Model finals was held on 6 December 2021

Miss Cote D'Ivoire, Olivia Yacé, won Top Model Competition and become the first quarter-finalist of Miss World 2021.

Designer Dress
Best Designer Dress Award was given to Korea during the Top Model finals of Miss World 2021.

Sports
Sports event was initially held on 1 December 2021. Miss Norway, Amine Storrød, had an asthma attack during the event which had to delay the rest of the competition. The winners were officially announced via Miss World Facebook page on 13 December 2021.

Multimedia
The winner were officially announced via Miss World Facebook page on 21 January 2022.

Beauty With a Purpose
The finalists were officially announced via Miss World Facebook page on 13 December 2021. The Top 6 finalists were announced as winners. The 18 other semifinalists were later announced via Miss World Facebook page through contestants' personal profiles.

Contestants 
97 contestants competed for the title.

Notes

References

External links 

Miss World
2021 beauty pageants
2022 beauty pageants
Beauty pageants in Puerto Rico
2021 in Puerto Rico
2022 in Puerto Rico
Events postponed due to the COVID-19 pandemic
Events affected by the COVID-19 pandemic